Groveland Township may refer to:

 Groveland Township, LaSalle County, Illinois
 Groveland Township, Tazewell County, Illinois
 Groveland Township, McPherson County, Kansas
 Groveland Township, Michigan
 Groveland Township, Spink County, South Dakota, in Spink County, South Dakota

See also
 Groveland (disambiguation)

Township name disambiguation pages